Daniyal was a Palestinian village in the Ramle Subdistrict. It was depopulated during the 1948 Arab–Israeli War on July 10, 1948, by the Yiftach Brigade under the first phase of Operation Dani. It was located 5 km east of Ramla and southeast of Lydda.

History
In 1838, Edward Robinson stopped by the village well, west of the village. He  estimated the depth of the well to be 160 feet. The villagers were Muslim, and the village was noted as being in the Lydda District.

In 1863,  Victor Guérin noted:   "a small mosque situated on a height; it contains the tomb of a saint, called Neby Danyal. Some olive trees and a palm tree surround it. Near there is a village of about forty houses, also called Danyal. I observed there, not far from the dwellings, a considerable number of silos, intended to preserve straw, barley, and wheat."

An official village list of about 1870 showed that the village had 24 houses and a population of 80, though the population count included men, only. 

In 1882, the PEF's Survey of Western Palestine (SWP)  described  Neby Danial: "A small settlement round the sacred shrine of the Prophet, with a well to the west. The tomb of Dan is shown here, and is believed by the Samaritans to be the true site."   They further noted that:  "The village of Neby Danial includes the Mukam of Neby Dan, from which it is said by the natives to take its name."

British Mandate era
In the 1922 census of Palestine conducted by the British Mandate authorities, Danial    had a population of 277 Muslims,  increasing slightly in the 1931 census to  284  Muslims, in a total of 71 houses.

In  the 1945 statistics, it had a population of 410 Muslims with a total of 2,808  dunums of land.  Of this, 37 dunums  were for plantations and irrigable land, 2,599 dunums were for cereals,  while  a total of 15 dunams were classified as built-up areas.

An elementary school for boys which is still standing today was founded in 1945, and had an enrollment of 55 students.

1948, aftermath
The village was depopulated after a military assault by Israeli forces on the July 10, 1948.  On that day, the  Yiftach Brigade reported: "Our forces are clearing the  Innaba – Jimzu – Daniyal area and are torching everything that can be burned." On July 11, they reported that they had conquered Jimzu and Daniel  and were  "busy clearing the villages and blowing up the houses." 

In September, 1948,  Daniyal was among the Palestinian villages that  Ben Gurion wanted destroyed. 

The Israeli settlement of Kfar Daniel was established on village land in 1949.

In 1992 it was described: "The shrine of al-Nabi Daniyal, the school, and seven well built houses are all that remain of the village. The shrine, deserted amid weeds and a few trees, is made of stone, with a second story rising on one side. The first story has arched windows and doors and the second has a porch and a rectangular window. The school is presently used by residents of Kefar Daniyyel. The houses are built of stone and are all flat-roofed, with a mix of arched and rectangular doors and windows. One house is used as a warehouse."

References

Bibliography

External links
Welcome To Daniyal, Palestine Remembered
Daniyal, Zochrot
Survey of Western Palestine, Map 13: IAA,  Wikimedia commons

Arab villages depopulated during the 1948 Arab–Israeli War
District of Ramla